Valev Uibopuu (19 October 1913 Vana-Antsla Parish (now Antsla Parish), Kreis Werro – 18 March 1997 Lund) was an Estonian writer. He is one of the most known Estonian expatriate writers.

In 1943, he fled to Finland and in 1944 to Sweden.

1954–1970, he worked for Estonian Writers' Cooperative publishing house and also being its chairman. 1970–1980, he taught at Lund University and at the same time he was the director of the university's Finno-Ugric Institute.

He died in 1997 in Lund, but he is buried at Lüllemäe Cemetery in Karula.

Works
 novel "Võõras kodu" (Vadstena 1945)
 novel "Keegi ei kuule meid" (Vadstena 1948)
 novel "Neli tuld" (Lund 1951)
 novel "Janu" (Lund 1957)
 novel "Markuse muutumised" (Lund 1961)
 novel "Lademed" (Lund 1970)
 novel "Kaks inimelu ajapöördeis" (double novel): "Mina ja tema" (Lund 1990) and "Ainult juhus" (Lund 1991)

References

1913 births
1997 deaths
People from Antsla Parish
People from Kreis Werro
20th-century Estonian writers
Estonian male novelists
Estonian male short story writers
Estonian editors
Estonian Finno-Ugrists
Academic staff of Lund University
Estonian World War II refugees
Estonian emigrants to Sweden
Recipients of the Order of the National Coat of Arms, 3rd Class